Conor Kenny (born 12 October 1992) is an Irish sportsperson. He plays hurling with his local club Borris–Ileigh and with the Tipperary senior inter-county team since 2014. Kenny is originally from Celbridge in Kildare and previously played for the Kildare hurling team.

Career
He started his intercounty career with Kildare playing in the Christy Ring Cup and the All-Ireland Under-21 B Hurling Championship.

He played in the All-Ireland Intermediate Hurling Championship winning team for Tipperary in 2013.
Kenny made his debut in January 2014 for Tipperary and in February 2014, he scored a goal against Clare in the 2014 Waterford Crystal Cup final as Tipperary won by 14 points.

Honours
Borris–Ileigh
Munster Senior Club Hurling Championship (1): 2019 (jc)
Tipperary Senior Hurling Championship (1): 2019 (jc)

Tipperary
Munster Intermediate Hurling Championship (1): 2013
All-Ireland Intermediate Hurling Championship (1): 2013
Waterford Crystal Cup (1): 2014
Munster Senior Hurling Championship (1): 2015

References

External links
Tipperary GAA Player Profile

Living people
1992 births
Borris-Ileigh hurlers
Kildare inter-county hurlers
Tipperary inter-county hurlers